Gregory Norton may refer to:

Sir Gregory Norton, 1st Baronet (1603–1652), Member of Parliament
Greg Norton (born 1959), American bassist
Greg Norton (baseball) (born 1972), former Major League Baseball player

See also
Greg Morton (born 1953), former American football player